Billy Jacques ( – ) was a rugby union and professional rugby league footballer who played in the 1890s and 1900s.

Jacques played for Hull F.C. before joining St. Helens in December 1895. He made his début against Oldham, but his appearance breached the rules, as neither Hull F.C. nor the Northern Rugby Football Union committee had given permission for the transfer to go ahead. As a result, Saints were deducted two points for fielding an ineligible player.  He went to make 50 appearances for the club, with his last appearance coming in the 1897 Challenge Cup Final defeat against Batley. He rejoined Hull F.C. in 1897. In 1898–99, he was the season's top point scorer. Jacques played 122 games for Hull FC, scoring 370 points (32 tries and 137 goals).

References

External links
Search for "Jacques" at rugbyleagueproject.org

 (archived by web.archive.org) Stats → PastPlayers → J at hullfc.com
 (archived by web.archive.org) Statistics at hullfc.com
Profile at saints.org.uk

1871 births
1957 deaths
English rugby league players
Hull F.C. players
Place of birth missing
Place of death missing
Rugby league centres
Rugby league players from Kingston upon Hull
Rugby league wingers
St Helens R.F.C. players
Yorkshire County RFU players